The Skirmish at Joncherey was a clash in the Territoire de Belfort, on the border between France and Germany, and was the first military action of the Western Front of World War I. It occurred in the village of Joncherey near the French–German border in Alsace-Lorraine. The skirmish took place a day before the German declaration of war against France on 3 August 1914.

Skirmish
They did not meet resistance, as the French had moved their troops back  from the border, to avoid provoking the Germans and to show good faith in their attempts to avoid war. Twice that morning as the German party advanced further into France, they exchanged fire with small groups of French infantry. At  Mayer slashed with his sabre at (but did not injure) a French sentry, who was on lookout at the entrance to Joncherey. French Corporal Jules Andre Peugeot and four other soldiers were at their billet, owned by a certain Louis Doucourt, eating breakfast at the time. Doucourt's daughter, Adrienne, came back inside from fetching water and reportedly said "The Prussians! The Prussians are coming!"

Around  Peugeot and his four comrades went to arrest the Germans. Upon meeting, Mayer fired three shots at Peugeot. One hit his shoulder and Peugeot fired back as he was falling. Peugeot's comrades fired at the patrol with pistols. Mayer was shot in the stomach and seconds later was killed by a shot to the head. Peugeot stumbled back to the billet house where he died at  Three more German soldiers were injured; one fled to the woods, where he hid for a few days before being captured; one went missing; and two made their way back to Germany.

References

Conflicts in 1914
1914 in France
Battles of World War I involving France
Battles of the Western Front (World War I)
Battles of World War I involving Germany
Causes of World War I
August 1914 events
France–Germany military relations